The 1927 Brunswick state election was held on 27 November 1927 to elect the 48 members of the Landtag of the Free State of Brunswick.

Results

References 

Brunswick
Elections in Lower Saxony